Age of Illusions is a 1965 Hungarian drama film directed by István Szabó. It was his first feature film as a director.

Cast 
 András Bálint - Jancsi
 Ilona Béres - Halk Éva
 Judit Halász - Habgab
 Kati Sólyom - Anni
 Cecília Esztergályos - Ági 
 Béla Asztalos - Laci
 Tamás Eröss - Matyi
 László Murányi - Gergely
 István Dékány - Füsi
 István Bujtor - Ági fiúja
 Klára Falvay - 
 Miklós Gábor - Flesch

References

External links 

1965 drama films
1965 films
Hungarian drama films